Villa Castelli is a comune in the province of Brindisi in Apulia, on the south-east Italy coast. It is a comune in Salento,  the borderline with Itria Valley. Its main economic activities are tourism and the growing of olives and grapes.

Main sights
The main attractions are the Castle (or Ducal Palace) and the church of Immacolata. The castle was built by the Orsini del Balzo in the Middle Ages  but was already in ruins in the 15th century. In the 17th century the Emperor bought it and turned it into a fortress, and later it was further expanded by the Ungaro. The church was built in the 10th century in an eclectic style, with both Gothic and Romanesque features.

Twin towns
 Kalyvia Thorikou, Greece

References

Cities and towns in Apulia
Localities of Salento